Moses Buttenwieser (April 5, 1862 in Beerfelden – March 11 or 12, 1939 in Palo Alto) was an American Bible scholar, educated at the universities of University of Würzburg, Leipzig, and Heidelberg, where he received his Ph.D. in 1897.

Being Jewish, he concentrated on the Old Testament. In 1897 he became professor of Biblical exegesis in the Hebrew Union College of Cincinnati, Ohio. His works include The Hebrew Elias-Apocalypse, in German (1897);  An Outline of Neo-Hebraic Apocalyptic Literature (1901);  The Prophets of Israel (1914);  The Book of Job (1922);  and numerous articles in learned publications.

Works 
 Die hebräische Elias-Apokalypse, und ihre Stellung in der apokalyptischen Litteratur des rabbinischen Schrifttums und der Kirche. Part 1: Kritische Ausgabe mit Erläuterungen, sprachlichen Untersuchungen, und einer Einleitung, nebst Übersetzung und Untersuchung der Abfassungszeit (= Heidelberg, PhD thesis, 1897), Leipzig: Pfeiffer, 1897.
 The Psalms. Chronologically treated with a new translation, Chicago: Univ. of Chicago Pr., 1938.

References 
 The concise dictionary of American Jewish biography, ed. Jacob Rader Marcus, Vol. 1: A - K; Brooklyn, NY: Carlson Publ., 1994, art. "Buttenwieser, Moses".
 Encyclopaedia Judaica, art. "Buttenwieser, Moses".

External links
Moses Buttenwieser. Jewish virtual library.

1862 births
1939 deaths
People from Beerfelden
19th-century German Jews
American religious writers
Jews and Judaism in Cincinnati
German emigrants to the United States
Hebrew Union College – Jewish Institute of Religion faculty
Heidelberg University alumni
Leipzig University alumni
Religious leaders from Ohio